Frederick Kempe (born September 5, 1954) is president and chief executive officer of the Atlantic Council, a foreign policy think tank and public policy group based in Washington, D.C. He is a journalist, author, columnist and a regular commentator on television and radio both in Europe and the United States. His book BERLIN 1961: Kennedy, Khrushchev and the Most Dangerous Place on Earth (Putnam) was released May 10, 2011, and was a New York Times bestseller.

Biography 

Born in Utah, Kempe is the son of German immigrants who came to the United States before World War II. He is a graduate of the University of Utah and earned his master's degree from Columbia University Graduate School of Journalism, where he was a member of the International Fellows program in the School of International Affairs. He lives in Washington, D.C. with his wife and daughter.

Career 

Kempe spent nearly thirty years with the Wall Street Journal, where he covered the rise of Solidarity in Poland, the ascent and fall of Mikhail Gorbachev in Russia, the wars in Afghanistan and Lebanon, the American invasion of Panama, the reunification of Germany and the collapse of Soviet Communism. He joined the Wall Street Journal in 1981 in London before opening the paper's Vienna bureau in 1984 and its Berlin bureau in 1990.

He won national and international prizes while serving in numerous management and reportorial capacities—editor, associate publisher, columnist and correspondent. He was most recently assistant managing editor, International, and "Thinking Global" columnist. He was previously for seven years the longest serving editor and associate publisher ever of the Wall Street Journal Europe and was European editor for the global Wall Street Journal from 2002 to 2005, also overseeing Middle Eastern reporting.

As managing editor from 1992–1997, he created the Central European Economic Review and co-founded Convergence, a magazine on Europe's digital economy.

In 2007, Kempe became president and chief executive officer of the Atlantic Council. Under his leadership, the Atlantic Council has quadrupled in size, expanding its staff, work and influence in areas that include international security, business and economics, energy, environment, and global issues of transatlantic interest, including Asia, Africa and Latin America.

For his work to strengthen the transatlantic partnership, he has been decorated by the presidents of Poland, Germany, and by King Carl XVI Gustaf of Sweden.

Kempe speaks fluent German.

Kempe has written three books that have been published in several languages: Divorcing the Dictator: America's Bungled Affair with Noriega; Siberian Odyssey: A Voyage into the Russian Soul; and Father/Land: A Personal Search for the New Germany. His fourth, Berlin 1961: Kennedy, Khrushchev and the World’s Most Dangerous Place was released on May 10, 2011 by G.P. Putnam's Sons.

He was until recently a regular columnist for Bloomberg News and Reuters and is a regular CNBC contributor.

In 2010, Kempe was chosen to be the lecturer for the year's installment of the Waldo Family Lecture Series on International Relations at Old Dominion University.

In 2014, he received the University of Utah's distinguished alumni award.

References

External links
 American International Club of Geneva
 Slate Magazine
 Brussels Forum biography
 Atlantic Council biography
 
Booknotes interview with Kempe on Divorcing the Dictator, March 11, 1990.

Living people
American chief executives
American male journalists
University of Utah alumni
Columbia University Graduate School of Journalism alumni
American people of German descent
Atlantic Council
1954 births